Raymond Edmond Narleski (November 25, 1928 – March 29, 2012) was a relief pitcher in Major League Baseball who played with the Cleveland Indians (1954–58) and Detroit Tigers (1959). He batted and threw right-handed. His father, Bill Narleski, was a shortstop for the Boston Red Sox from 1929 to 1930.

Born in Camden, New Jersey, Narleski pitched for Collingswood High School.

In a six-season career, Narleski posted a 43–33 record with 454 strikeouts, a 3.60 ERA, and 58 saves in 702 innings. He made the American League All-Star team in 1956 and 1958.

Narleski was an overpowering pitcher with a blazing fastball which he mixed with a sharp-breaking curve and a change-up that can kept hitters guessing. Unfortunately, Narleski had a simple problem: he was overshadowed by one of the greatest pitching staffs in major league history, the Indians Big Four Bob Feller, Bob Lemon, Early Wynn and Mike Garcia. Nevertheless, in his rookie season Narleski posted 13 saves for the 1954 AL Champions. In 1955 he went 9–1 and led the league with 19 saves and 60 appearances, and in 1957 he finished 11–5 with 16 saves. At this time, he gradually joined the starting rotation.

In 1958 Narleski went 13–10 in 44 games, 24 as a starter. At the end of the season he was sent to Detroit along with bullpen teammate Don Mossi, in the same trade that brought Billy Martin to the Indians. Hampered by shoulder problems in 1959, Narleski finished 4–12 with a 5.78 ERA and five saves in 42 games. Narleski missed the entire 1960 season due to a ruptured disc that required surgery. Narleski went to Tigers spring training camp in 1961 but quit the club when Detroit wouldn't tell him whether he would make the roster or not. Narleski saying "I won't go back to the minors", because it "means another year out of my arm and I'm too old for that."

After his retirement, Narleski lived in Laurel Springs, New Jersey. A resident of Gloucester Township, New Jersey at the time of his death, Narleski died at the age of 83 on March 29, 2012. He is buried in Eglington Cemetery, Clarksboro, New Jersey

See also
 List of Major League Baseball annual saves leaders
 List of second-generation Major League Baseball players

References

External links

1928 births
2012 deaths
American League All-Stars
Baseball players from Camden, New Jersey
Collingswood High School alumni
Cedar Rapids Indians players
Cleveland Indians players
Dallas Eagles players
Detroit Tigers players
Indianapolis Indians players
Major League Baseball pitchers
People from Gloucester Township, New Jersey
People from Laurel Springs, New Jersey
Wilkes-Barre Indians players